Corus is a genus of longhorn beetles of the subfamily Lamiinae. The name Corus may be an invalid junior homonym of Corus Jousseaume, 1877, though the latter may have been in error for Borus Albers, 1850.

 Corus albithorax Breuning, 1960
 Corus albomarmoratus Breuning, 1949
 Corus albopunctatus (Breuning, 1935)
 Corus breuningi Lepesme, 1943
 Corus burgeoni (Breuning, 1935)
 Corus caffer Fahraeus, 1872
 Corus collaris (Chevrolat, 1856)
 Corus costiger (Quedenfeldt, 1883)
 Corus cretaceus (Chevrolat, 1858)
 Corus cylindricus (Breuning, 1935)
 Corus exiguus Breuning, 1939
 Corus fasciculosus (Aurivillius, 1903)
 Corus flavus (Breuning, 1935)
 Corus laevepunctatus Breuning, 1938
 Corus laevidorsis Kolbe, 1893
 Corus laevifrons Breuning, 1947
 Corus latus Breuning, 1938
 Corus leonensis (Breuning, 1935)
 Corus lesnei (Breuning, 1936)
 Corus luridus Breuning, 1938
 Corus microphthalmus Hunt & Breuning, 1957
 Corus moisescoi Lepesme, 1946
 Corus monodi Lepesme & Breuning, 1953
 Corus nyassanus Breuning, 1938
 Corus obscurus Breuning, 1938
 Corus olivaceus Breuning, 1969
 Corus parallelus (Breuning, 1935)
 Corus parvus Breuning, 1938
 Corus plurifasciculatus Breuning, 1950
 Corus pseudocaffer (Breuning, 1936)
 Corus pseudocostiger Breuning, 1936
 Corus raffrayi Breuning, 1970
 Corus strandiellus (Breuning, 1935)
 Corus thoracicalis (Jordan, 1894)
 Corus tubericollis Breuning, 1981

References